= Mülheimer Friedhof =

Cemetery in Cologne, Germany

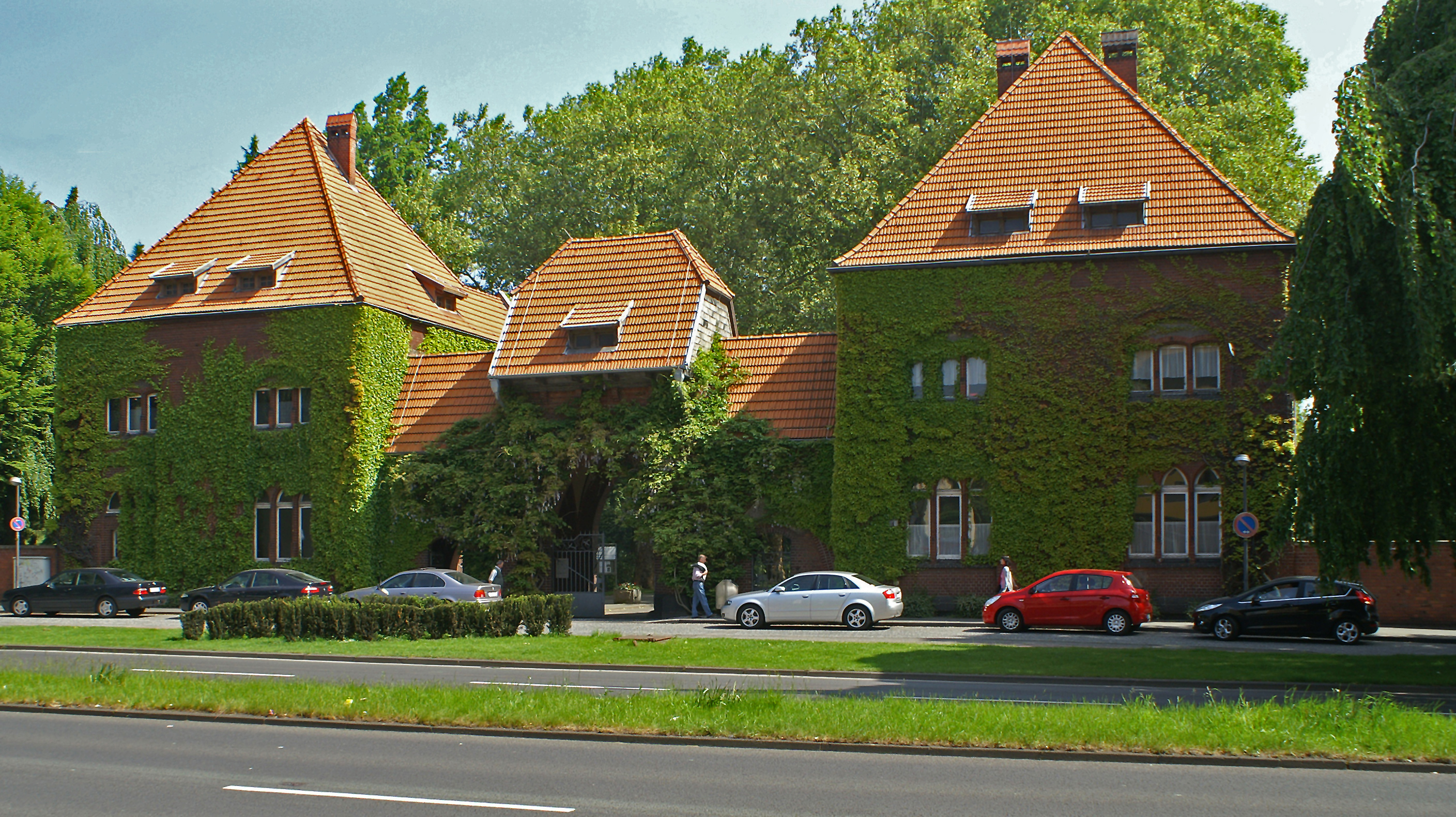
- < > Ivy‑covered entrance building of Mülheimer Friedhof
- Interactive map of Mülheimer Friedhof

Details
- Established: 30 September 1904
- Location: Mülheim an der Ruhr, North Rhine-Westphalia
- Country: Germany
- Coordinates: 50°56′52″N 7°01′32″E
- Type: Public cemetery
- Website: https://www.stadt-koeln.de/leben-in-koeln/freizeit-natur-sport/friedhoefe/adressen/muelheim

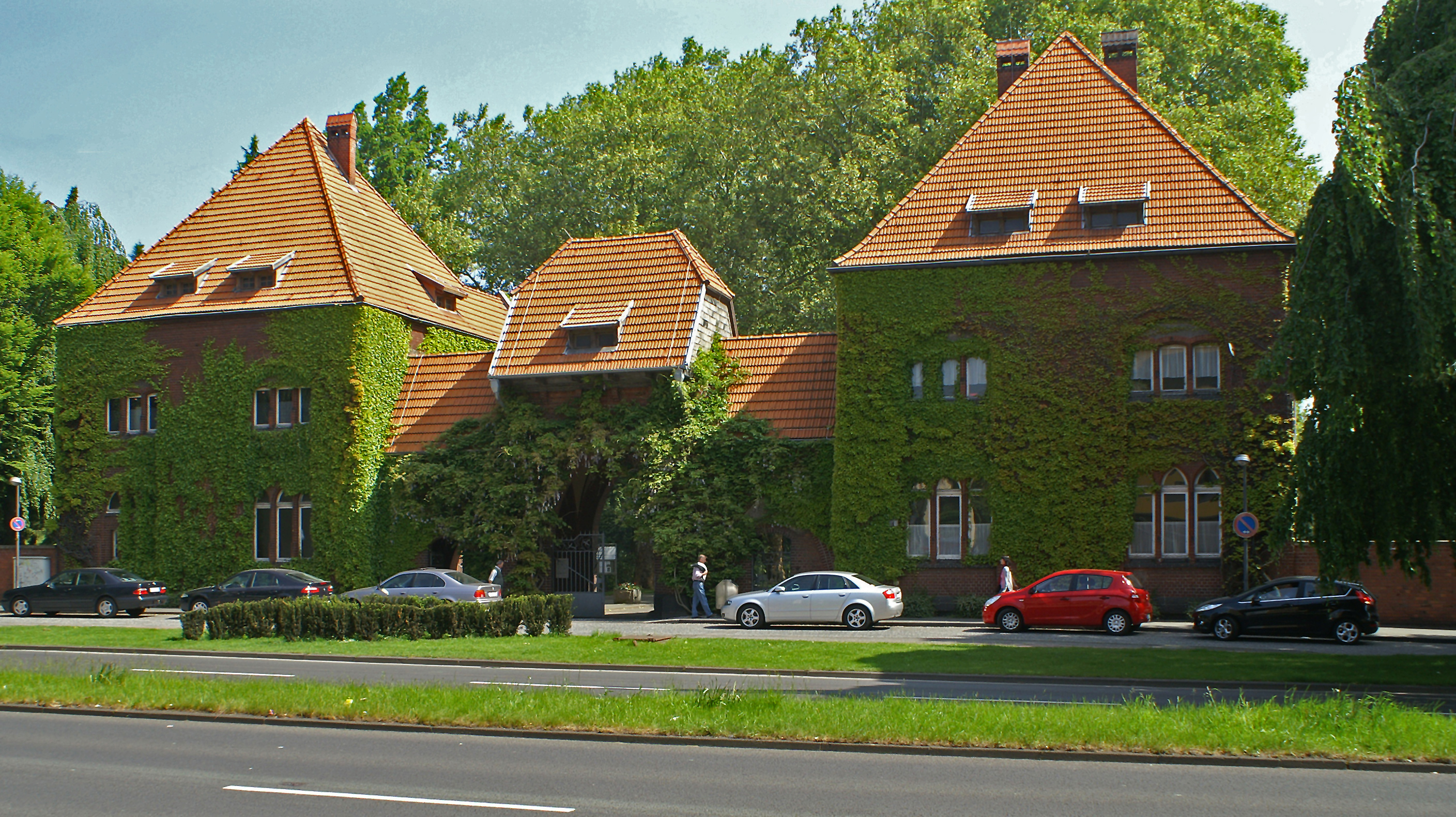
Cemetery entrance

Mülheimer Friedhof is a cemetery in Cologne, Germany. It was established on 30 September 1904.
